The Superleague Formula round Italy is a round of the Superleague Formula. ACI Vallelunga Circuit hosted the first Italian event in 2008. In 2009 Autodromo Nazionale Monza hosted their first event.

Winners

References

External links
 Superleague Formula Official Website
 V12 Racing: Independent Superleague Formula Fansite Magazine

Italy